The Viña del Mar International Song Festival 2013 was held from February 24, 2013 through Friday March 1, 2013. The musical event was broadcast via Chilean TV channel Chilevisión. The hosts of the event were Rafael Araneda and Eva Gómez.

The event was broadcast in Chile via Chilevisión and Chilevisión HD, and internationally via A&E for Latin America, TV Azteca for Mexico and Paravisión in Paraguay.

Development

The musical performers for the main show were announced on August 17, 2012. These included the Chilean acts 31 Minutos and Los Prisioneros former front man Jorge González. Urban and Reggaeton musician Daddy Yankee, who celebrates a huge success this year in the country with hits like "Limbo", "Lovumba" and "Pasarela", all of which were top 5 in Chilean charts. Another artist presented was Spanish Miguel Bosé. Miguel was promoting his latest album titled Papitwo, which includes the song "Aire Soy" with Ximena Sariñana. This song had moderate success on the national charts, peaking inside the top 20. Also confirmed as part of the judging panel was Mexican singer Gloria Trevi. On August 29, 2012, the municipality and Chilevisión also confirmed the band Maná as part of the show, performing live for the third time  at this venue. The last time they appeared was in 2003.

On September 7, 2012, new musical acts were confirmed to perform live in the show, including the Jonas Brothers, who will reunite to perform after a career hiatus. The Chilean Francisca Valenzuela will join the judging panel, as well as perform in the main show. She had a successful year with her album Buen Soldado certified gold in Chile and hit singles topping the charts like "Quiero Verte Más" and "Buen Soldado". Romeo Santos will return, this time on his own, after his debut on this stage with his band Aventura in 2011. Also announced were the tropical sensation La Sonora de Tommy Rey, and the humoristic shows by Memo Bunke, Los Atletas de La Risa and Hermógenes con H. On September 29, 2012, Sir Elton John was confirmed for the festival. This marks his first time in this show, and he is considered to be one of the most important artists scheduled to perform for the event this year. New Spanish artist Pablo Alborán was also announced as a judge for the competition. He is known for huge pop hits like the song "Solamente Tu" which peaked at number 2 in the Chilean charts the past year.

The latest artists confirmed were the Argentinian band Los Autenticos Decadentes and Reggaeton duo Wisin & Yandel. They have one of the hottest tracks of the summer, "Algo Me Gusta de Ti", which is enjoying heavy radio airplay. Both of them are scheduled to perform in the last day of the festival.

Day 2 of the festival, featuring performers Romeo Santos and Daddy Yankee, was the first night sold out after ticket sales opened.

Stage
The Preparations for the event include aspects such as television broadcasting and stage design. The production and features that have defined the stage by Madis, with a bet that appeals to nostalgia and focus on the public. "The closeness to the people is crucial, and will happen through cameras in the gallery, social networking integration and tell the story of the contest, these are some of the challenges we have set ourselves," says Álex Hernández, director of the festival. To tell the story will be a projection of the former led bandshell. "The digital reconstruction of the bandshell is something protagonist, is a great way walking about 150 meters, maneuver, i.e. movement and interaction. They want to appeal to something nostalgic, "says Marcelo Rojas, director of Madis, the company in charge of stage design.

The scenario also includes a screen of 200 square meters, the largest that has been installed at a show in Chile, which will occupy the entire bottom, plus 150 meters side shields. "It is large, in order to give content to the music parallels besides the visual of each artist and to generate the skills and Festival Overture," says Hernandez. Another novelty is the construction of a place to the jury on the stage, right beside viewed from the front, in one of the walkways. "They assessed from above and be exposed in the show, being part of the show," adds the director.

Along with this, for the 2013 version of the event was removed near the gallery platform was installed this year and where the animators Eva Gómez and Rafael Araneda interacted with the public. Instead they installed cameras that record what happens to the audience, that will make images of any person in the foreground.

Regarding the technical elements, including this year's challenges include synchronization of everything from scenic aspects to lighting, to sound. The ultimate goal is that the telecast is of better bill, and that the audience at the Quinta Vergara live an international experience, indicated from the organization. "The idea is that the technology is at the service of emotions," said Hernandez. Meanwhile, Marcelo Rojas, explains: "It is mixing technology with scenic elements themselves, creating a new design. We use digital elements, via video, to enhance the scene. The idea is that everything is more theatrical. "

Red carpet
A launch event was realized on February 22, 2013, in Casino Viña del Mar with a long red carpet in which celebrities, artists and festival participants walked, this was broadcast via Chilevisión in prime time with interviews and a Glam Cam 360°.

Confirmed performers

 31 Minutos
 Francisca Valenzuela
 Jorge González
 La Sonora de Tommy Rey
 Miguel Bosé
 Pablo Alborán
 Chino & Nacho
 Daddy Yankee
 Romeo Santos
 Albert Hammond
 Elton John
 Jonas Brothers
 Maná
 Gloria Trevi
 Wisin & Yandel
 Los Auténticos Decadentes

Judges
 Mario Mutis
 Roberto Artiagoitía "Rumpy"
 Matías del Río
 Francisca Merino
 Francisca Valenzuela
 Magaly León 
 Albert Hammond
 Gloria Trevi
 Inés Sainz
 Pablo Alborán

Chronology

Day 1

Day 2

Day 3

Day 4

Day 5

Day 6

Participants

International competition

Folk competition

Notes

A  Magaly León, is a Chilean unknown woman who won the contest for "El jurado del pueblo" (the popular judge).
B  The song replaced Canadian representative.

References

External links
 Official website (Spanish)

Viña del Mar International Song Festival by year
Vina Del Mar International Song Festival, 2013
2013 music festivals
2013 festivals in Chile